Southern Sorsogon (also Waray Sorsogon, Gubat) is an Austronesian language spoken in the southern part of Sorsogon, Philippines, in the municipalities of Gubat, Barcelona, Bulusan, Santa Magdalena, Matnog, Bulan, and Irosin. Although located in the Bicol Region, Southern Sorsogon belongs to the Warayan Bisayan subgroup, and is mutually intelligible to Waray which is spoken to the south on the neighboring island of Samar. The other two Bisayan languages spoken in the Bicol Region are Masbate Sorsogon and Masbateño.

Phonology 
Southern Sorsogon has the following phoneme inventory:

Grammar

Personal pronouns 
Southern Sorsogon has three pronoun sets.

Verbs 
Verbs in Southern Sorsogon are inflected for focus and aspect.

See also
 Waray language
 Waray people
 Masbateño language
 Bisakol languages
 Visayans

References 

Visayan languages
Languages of Sorsogon